Michael Schindler (born 7 September 1988), better known by his stage name Shindy, is a German rapper. He is currently signed to record label Friends with Money after leaving ersguterjunge.

Life and career

1988: Early life 
Schindler was born to a German father and a Greek mother. He spent his childhood working in a restaurant run by his Greek grandparents. He began rapping at age 14 and by 16 was noticed by Greek-German rapper Jaysus who invited him to contribute some tracks with him.

2012: Collaborations 
In 2012, Shindy was signed to Kay One's label. He gained popular fame through Kay One's album Prince of Belvedair where Shindy was featured on some tracks. Shindy's big popularity came when featured on Kay One's chant in support of the Germany national football team titled "Finale wir kommen". After one more single together, he parted ways in unfriendly terms with Kay One allying himself with Bushido and Bushido's rap label ersguterjunge, at the same time issuing a diss track against Kay One.

2013: NWA and breakthrough 
On 21 June 2013, he released the single "Immer immer mehr" with Bushido and Sido, followed on 12 July 2013 with the debut album NWA with the initials denoting "Nie wieder arbeiten" (meaning "never work again"). The album topped the German and Austrian charts and reaching Top 3 in Switzerland.

2019: Drama and mainstream popularity 
After two years of absence from the media, mainly due to disputes with his old record label Shindy came back with the lead single DODI from his album Drama released later that year. Shortly after he released the songs Road2Goat and Affalterbach.
With the release of the single Nautilus on 11 May 2019, Shindy gained much more mainstream recognition. It officially entered the charts on 17 May 2019. The song reached number 2 on the German charts for a week.

Discography

Studio albums
 NWA (2013)
 NWA 2.0 (2013)
 FVCKB!TCHES$GETMONE¥ (2014)
 Dreams (2016)
 Drama (2019)

Collaborations
 CLA$$IC (with Bushido)  (2015)

Awards and nominations

Results

References

1988 births
Living people
German people of Greek descent
German rappers
People from Bietigheim-Bissingen